Jamesonbukta is a bay in the island of  Jan Mayen.  It is located east of Eggøya, on the southern side and central part of Jan Mayen.

References

Landforms of Jan Mayen
Bays of Norway